is a Japanese poet and an international civil servant.

Career 
He graduated from the Faculty of Law, the University of Tokyo. He studied Haiku under Seison Yamaguchi, engaged as a chief editor of Haiku Group called "Genseirin" and a leader of Haiku Group called Hototogisu in the University of Tokyo.

He joined the Ministry of International Trade and Industry in 1976. 
He received his master's degree from Yale University in 1982. 
He participated in founding the haiku magazine "Ten'i" as a promoter in 1990. 
He has assumed numerous positions, including Representative of the Asia-Pacific Region of the Japan Overseas Development Corporation in 1993.

In 1996, he organized "Short Poem International Symposium" in Phuket Province, Thailand. 
In 1998, he was posted to Ehime Prefecture, Japan. and published an anthology of haiku entitled "Bureaucrat".
He participated in the drafting of the Matsuyama Declaration in 1999, and supervised the joint translation.

He was engaged in the establishment of the Masaoka Shiki International Haiku Awards in 2000, the 21st Century Ehime Haiku Prizes in 2002, and the Shiba Fukio Awards for New Haiku Poets, also in 2002. 
Today, he serves as a consultant for screening committees of these awards and prizes. 
He established the Asia Cosmopolitan Awards in 2012. He currently works also as president of the Economic Research Institute for ASEAN and East Asia since June 2008 (his title was changed from Executive Director at June 5, 2015) and visiting professor of Waseda University since April 2013 and visiting professor of Universitas Darma Persada since October 2013.

References

External links
Blogging Along Tobacco Road: 2008 Masaoka Shiki International Haiku Awards
MH Book Review—Haiku Universe by Modern Haiku Association
 International Haiku Convention 2004 Lecture of Awardees of Masaoka Shiki International Haiku Grand Prize in 2004, Gary Snyder
Haiku Convention 2009　Lecture of Awardees of Masaoka Shiki International Haiku Grand Prize in 2008, Touta Kaneko
 Economic Research Institute for ASEAN and East Asia

1952 births
Living people
Japanese civil servants
20th-century Japanese poets
Japanese haiku poets